Scott Township is one of twelve townships in Floyd County, Iowa, USA.  As of the 2000 census, its population was 223.

Geography
According to the United States Census Bureau, Scott Township covers an area of 41.86 square miles (108.42 square kilometers); of this, 41.81 square miles (108.3 square kilometers, 99.89 percent) is land and 0.05 square miles (0.12 square kilometers, 0.11 percent) is water.

Adjacent townships
 Rockford Township (north)
 Ulster Township (northeast)
 Union Township (east)
 Coldwater Township, Butler County (southeast)
 Bennezette Township, Butler County (south)
 West Fork Township, Franklin County (southwest)
 Dougherty Township, Cerro Gordo County (west)
 Owen Township, Cerro Gordo County (northwest)

Airports and landing strips
 Knoop Airport

Rivers
 Shell Rock River

School districts
 Greene Community School District
 Rudd-Rockford-Marble Rock Community School District

Political districts
 Iowa's 4th congressional district
 State House District 14
 State Senate District 7

References
 United States Census Bureau 2008 TIGER/Line Shapefiles
 United States Board on Geographic Names (GNIS)
 United States National Atlas

External links
 US-Counties.com
 City-Data.com

Townships in Floyd County, Iowa
Townships in Iowa